Jamey Johnson (born July 14, 1975) is an American country music singer and songwriter. 

Signed to BNA Records in 2005, Johnson made his debut with his single "The Dollar", the title track to his 2006 album The Dollar. He was dropped from BNA in 2006 and signed to Mercury Nashville Records in March 2008, releasing his second album, the gold-certified That Lonesome Song. This album produced two singles, the top 10 hit "In Color" and "High Cost of Living". Johnson has since released two more albums, The Guitar Song in 2010 and Living for a Song: A Tribute to Hank Cochran in 2012. In 2014, he released a five-song Christmas EP titled The Christmas Song. In addition to most of his own material, Johnson has co-written singles for Willie Nelson and Merle Haggard, Trace Adkins, George Strait, James Otto, Joe Nichols and Jessie James Decker.

Early life 
Johnson was born on July 14, 1975, in Enterprise, Alabama, and raised in Montgomery, Alabama. From an early age, he was influenced by country acts such as Alabama and Alan Jackson, the latter of whom was the first act that he saw in concert. After graduating from Jefferson Davis High School, Johnson attended Jacksonville State University, the same university from which Alabama lead singer Randy Owen graduated. During his time at Jacksonville State University, he was a member of the Marching Southerners.

Johnson quit college after two years and served in the United States Marine Corps Reserve for four years. While in the Marines, he began playing country music in various bars in the Montgomery area; one of his first gigs was opening for David Allan Coe. By 2000, Johnson had moved to Nashville, Tennessee, to pursue a career in country music. One of his first connections was with Greg Perkins, a fiddler who had played for Tanya Tucker, Tammy Wynette, and other artists. Perkins invited Johnson to sing as a duet partner with Gretchen Wilson on a demo tape. Songs for which Johnson sang demos include "Songs About Me" (cut by Trace Adkins) and "That's How They Do It in Dixie" (cut by Hank Williams, Jr. with Big & Rich, Gretchen Wilson, and Van Zant).

Johnson had also made connections with producer and songwriter Buddy Cannon, who helped him land a songwriting contract. Among Johnson's first cuts as a songwriter was "Honky Tonk Badonkadonk", which Adkins released from his 2005 album Songs About Me. That song he co-wrote along with hit songwriter Dallas Davidson and fellow country singer-songwriter Randy Houser, who later worked with Johnson again co-writing "My Cowboy" for country pop singer Jessie James for her self-titled debut album.

Career

Career beginnings and That Lonesome Song (2005–2009) 
By 2005, Johnson had been signed to a recording contract with BNA Records. His first single, entitled "The Dollar", was released that year, followed by his Buddy Cannon-produced debut album (also entitled The Dollar) in March 2006. "The Dollar" went on to peak at No. 14 on the Billboard Hot Country Songs charts. The album's second single, "Rebelicious", failed to enter the charts and Johnson was dropped from BNA.

After the loss of his record deal, Johnson divorced his wife and took on a reclusive lifestyle, residing in a friend's house while working on his songwriting. He wrote several songs for other artists. In 2006, George Strait reached No. 1 on the Country chart with "Give It Away", a song which Johnson co-wrote with Bill Anderson and Cannon. This song became Strait's 51st No. 1 on the Billboard country charts, setting a new record for most No. 1s on that chart.

In 2007, Trace Adkins charted with two more songs that Johnson co-wrote: "Ladies Love Country Boys" and "I Got My Game On", the former being Adkins' first No. 1 in 10 years. Also in 2007, Joe Nichols reached Top 20 with "Another Side of You", another song co-written by Johnson. This song was the first single on Nichols's album Real Things, which also contained "She's All Lady", a song that Johnson originally recorded on The Dollar.

Johnson was part of the Fox TV television series Nashville, which was cancelled after two episodes in September 2007.

Johnson released an album in 2008, That Lonesome Song, which was only made available online. The album drew the attention of Mercury Nashville Records, who signed him to a record deal in 2008. His first single for the label, "In Color", was released in March 2008. This song, which Johnson co-wrote with Lee Thomas Miller and James Otto, entered the Top 40 in June 2008, and That Lonesome Song was released on CD in August of that year. "In Color" peaked at No. 9 on the Country chart in January 2009 and was followed a month later by "High Cost of Living", which managed to crack the Top 40, but only reaching No. 34. By April 2009, That Lonesome Song was certified Gold by the RIAA.

A fifth single, "My Way to You", was issued in July 2009. The song was released to radio on July 13, 2009, and debuted at No. 56 on the U.S. Billboard Hot Country Songs chart. The song peaked at No. 52 in September 2009.

Johnson was nominated for the 2009 CMA Awards New Artist of the Year, and has been nominated for the 2010 Academy of Country Music Top New Solo Vocalist.

The Guitar Song (2010–2012) 
In 2010, Johnson released a follow up to his 2008 album, That Lonesome Song. The album titled The Guitar Song was released on September 14, 2010. Upon its release, The Guitar Song was met with overwhelming praise and universal acclaim from music critics. The album debuted at number four on the U.S. Billboard 200 and number one on the U.S. Billboard Top Country Albums, selling 63,000 copies its first week of release.

Johnson released three singles from the album, including "Playing the Part", in summer 2010. The music video for the single was released in October, and was directed by Matthew McConaughey, who also stars in the video as a dancing gorilla.

Johnson was the supporting act on Kid Rock's 2011 Born Free Tour, accompanying Rock on a duet or two during most concerts.  He was also a main stage act on Willie Nelson's Country Throwdown from May to July 2011.

Living for a Song and new label (2012–present) 
In addition to producing other acts and writing new material, Johnson released his fourth studio album titled Living for a Song: A Tribute to Hank Cochran on October 6, 2012. The album is a tribute to songwriter Hank Cochran. The album garnered Johnson a nomination at the 55th Grammy Awards for Best Country album. The album paired him with acts such as Ray Price, Willie Nelson, Alison Krauss, Emmylou Harris, Elvis Costello, George Strait, Vince Gill, and Merle Haggard. Longtime collaborator and producer Buddy Cannon oversaw the project. The album was released on vinyl September 25, 2012, and other formats on October 16, 2012.

Following a dispute with his label, Johnson founded his own label, Big Gassed Records. His first release on the label was a Christmas-themed EP, The Christmas Song, including several covers and one new original song, which was released in November 2014. It was announced that more new music would follow in 2015. In January 2015, Johnson released a new song, "Alabama Pines" as a free download. This was followed by the release of another single, "You Can", in February.

In a 2017 interview, Johnson stated that he had been having more difficulty with songwriting after an incident about seven years prior when he received a concussion due to slipping on ice and hitting his head. In 2019, Johnson played alongside Don Was, Warren Haynes, Lukas Nelson, and Cyril Neville on The Last Waltz Tour, a live celebration of The Band's 1976 farewell show at the Winterland Ballroom, also known as The Last Waltz.

On March 19, 2022, Bill Anderson invited him to become a member of the Grand Ole Opry, which he accepted; Johnson had performed regularly on the show for the previous seventeen years. He was inducted on May 14, 2022.

Discography

Studio albums

Extended plays

Singles 

A"The Dollar" did not enter the Billboard Hot 100, but peaked on the Bubbling Under Hot 100 Singles chart at number one.

Music videos

Other appearances

Awards and nominations 
Johnson received three Grammy Award nominations at the 51st Grammy Awards: Best Country Album for That Lonesome Song, and Best Country Song and Best Male Country Vocal Performance for "In Color". "In Color" won the Academy of Country Music's 2009 award for Song of the Year and the same award during the 2009 Country Music Association Awards. Going into 2010, Johnson received two more Grammy Award nominations for the 52nd Grammy Awards: Best Country Song and Best Male Country Vocal Performance, both for his 2009 single "High Cost of Living".

|-
| rowspan="2"| 2007
| Academy of Country Music
| Song of the Year – Give It Away
| 
|-
| Country Music Association
| Song of the Year – "Give It Away"
| 
|-
| rowspan="10"| 2009
| rowspan="3"| 51st Grammy Awards
| Best Country Album – That Lonesome Song
| 
|-
| Best Country Song – "In Color"
| 
|-
| Best Male Country Vocal Performance – "In Color"
| 
|-
| rowspan="3"| Academy of Country Music
| Song of the Year – "In Color"
| 
|-
| Top New Male Artist
| 
|-
| Top Album of the Year – That Lonesome Song
| 
|-
| rowspan="4"| Country Music Association
| Song of the Year – "In Color"
| 
|-
| Single of the Year – "In Color"
| 
|-
| New Artist of the Year
| 
|-
| Album of the Year – That Lonesome Song
| 
|-
| rowspan="4"| 2010
| rowspan="2"| 52nd Grammy Awards
| Best Country Song – "High Cost of Living"
| 
|-
| Best Male Country Vocal Performance – "High Cost of Living"
| 
|-
| Academy of Country Music
| Top New Solo Vocalist
| 
|-
| Country Music Association Awards
| Musical Event – "Bad Angel" (with Dierks Bentley and Miranda Lambert)
| 
|-
|rowspan=3|2011
|rowspan=3|53rd Grammy Awards
| Best Male Country Vocal Performance – "Macon"
| 
|-
| Best Country Collaboration with Vocals – "Bad Angel" (with Dierks Bentley and Miranda Lambert)
| 
|-
| Best Country Album – The Guitar Song
| 
|-
| 2013
| 55th Grammy Awards
| Best Country Album – Living for a Song: A Tribute to Hank Cochran
| 
|}

References

External links 
 
 
 

1975 births
American country singer-songwriters
American male singer-songwriters
People from Enterprise, Alabama
BNA Records artists
Grand Ole Opry members
Living people
Mercury Records artists
Musicians from Montgomery, Alabama
Outlaw country singers
United States Marine Corps reservists
United States Marines
21st-century American singers
21st-century American male singers
Country musicians from Alabama
Singer-songwriters from Alabama
Thirty Tigers artists